Victoria Hospital may refer to:

Australia
 Queen Victoria Hospital, Melbourne
 Royal Perth Rehabilitation Hospital, originally called the Victoria Hospital, Subiaco
 Royal Victorian Eye and Ear Hospital

Canada
 Royal Victoria Regional Health Centre, Barrie, Ontario
 Victoria Hospital (London, Ontario)
 Royal Victoria Hospital (Montreal), Quebec
 Victoria Hospital for Sick Children, Toronto, Ontario
 Victoria General Hospital, Victoria, British Columbia
 Victoria General Hospital (Winnipeg), Manitoba

Hong Kong
Victoria Hospital, Hong Kong

India
 Victoria Hospital (Bangalore Medical College), Karnataka

Ireland
 Royal Victoria Hospital, Belfast, Northern Ireland
 Royal Victoria Eye and Ear Hospital, Dublin

Israel
 Augusta Victoria Hospital, Jerusalem

Pakistan
 Bahawal Victoria Hospital, Bahawalpur

Saint Lucia
 Victoria Hospital (Saint Lucia), Castries, Saint Lucia

South Africa
 Victoria Hospital (Alice), Alice, Eastern Cape
 Victoria Hospital Wynberg, Cape Town

United Kingdom
 Royal Victoria Hospital, Belfast, Northern Ireland
 Blackpool Victoria Hospital, England
 Royal Victoria Hospital, Bournemouth, England (established 1889)
 Royal Victoria Hospital, Dover, England (established 1851)
 Royal Victoria Hospital, Dundee, Scotland (established 1899)
 Royal Victoria Hospital, Edinburgh, Scotland
 Queen Victoria Hospital, East Grinstead, West Sussex, England
 Royal Victoria Hospital, Folkestone, England (established 1846)
 New Victoria Hospital, Glasgow, Scotland
 Victoria Hospital, Kirkcaldy, Scotland
 Queen Victoria Hospital, Morecambe, Lancashire
 Royal Victoria Military Hospital, Netley
 Royal Victoria Infirmary, Newcastle upon Tyne, England (established 1751)
 Victoria Eye Hospital, Hereford
 Victoria Hospital, Richmond, North Yorkshire
 Victoria Hospital, Rothesay, Scotland

See also
 :Category:Hospitals in Victoria (Australia)